Lazzaro Tavarone (1556–1641) was an Italian painter of the late-Renaissance and Mannerist period, active mainly in his native Genoa and in Spain.

He was the pupil of the painter Luca Cambiasi. Tavarone accompanied Cambiaso to Spain in 1583, and helped decorate the Escorial for the Spanish King, including the chaotic battle painting of Battle of La Higueruela. He returned to Genoa in 1594, where he became well known both as portrait and history painter. He painted a Martyrdom of San Lorenzo in the Genoa Cathedral. He also painted frescoes in the Palazzos Saluzzi and Adorni. He painted frescoes on the Life of Sant’Ambrogio for the Oratorio di Sant'Ambrogio. He also painted scenes from the life of Columbus.

References

1556 births
1641 deaths
16th-century Italian painters
Italian male painters
17th-century Italian painters
Painters from Genoa
Italian Mannerist painters
Fresco painters